Bleekrodea is a genus of flowering plants belonging to the family Moraceae.

Its native range is Madagascar, Tropical Asia.

Species:

Bleekrodea insignis 
Bleekrodea madagascariensis 
Bleekrodea tonkinensis

References

Moraceae
Moraceae genera